John Griffin (c. 1771 – February 9, 1846, Cuba, Allegany County, New York) was an American lawyer and politician from New York.

Life
While living in Ontario County, New York, he fought in the War of 1812. He removed to Cuba NY in 1820. He was First Judge of the Allegany County Court from 1823 to 1833.

He was a member of the New York State Senate (8th D.) from 1833 to 1836, sitting in the 56th, 57th, 58th and 59th New York State Legislatures.

Sources
The New York Civil List compiled by Franklin Benjamin Hough (pages 129ff, 141 and 393; Weed, Parsons and Co., 1858)
Death notice transcribed from the Cattaraugus Republican (issue of February 16, 1846)

1770s births
1846 deaths
New York (state) state senators
Anti-Masonic Party politicians from New York (state)
19th-century American politicians
People from Cuba, New York
New York (state) state court judges